Noginsky (masculine), Noginskaya (feminine), or Noginskoye (neuter) is the name of several rural localities in Russia:
Noginskaya, Arkhangelsk Oblast, a village in Udimsky Selsoviet of Kotlassky District of Arkhangelsk Oblast
Noginskaya, Ivanovo Oblast, a village in Kineshemsky District of Ivanovo Oblast
Noginskaya, Syamzhensky District, Vologda Oblast, a village in Noginsky Selsoviet of Syamzhensky District of Vologda Oblast
Noginskaya, Verkhovazhsky District, Vologda Oblast, a village in Kolengsky Selsoviet of Verkhovazhsky District of Vologda Oblast